Cannes is a small community in the Canadian province of Nova Scotia, located in Richmond County. It was named after Cannes in France.

External links
Cannes on Destination Nova Scotia

References

Communities in Richmond County, Nova Scotia
General Service Areas in Nova Scotia